The IND Fulton Street Line is a rapid transit line of the IND Division of the New York City Subway, running from the Cranberry Street Tunnel under the East River through all of central Brooklyn to a terminus in Ozone Park, Queens. The IND Rockaway Line branches from it just east of Rockaway Boulevard. The A train runs express during daytime hours and local at night on the underground portion of the line; it runs local on the elevated portion of the line at all times. The C train runs local on the underground portion of the line at all times except late nights.

The line runs primarily along Fulton Street, Pitkin Avenue, and Liberty Avenue. The underground portion, which constitutes the majority of the line, was built for the city-owned Independent Subway System (IND), opening between 1936 and 1956. The elevated portion in Queens was originally part of the Brooklyn–Manhattan Transit Corporation (BMT)'s Fulton Street elevated line; the Elevated in Brooklyn was closed and demolished in stages with the opening of the subway line.

Description and service
The following services use part or all of the IND Fulton Street Line:

Under Fulton Street, the line is mainly single level, except at Nostrand Avenue, where the express tracks are on the upper level and the local tracks are on the lower level. During the subway line's construction in the late 1930s and early 1940s, the old, now-demolished BMT Fulton Street Elevated (which the IND line replaced) had to be supported.

The stations along Liberty Avenue in Queens, from 80th Street–Hudson Street through Ozone Park–Lefferts Boulevard, as well as the current three-track elevated structure, were built for the elevated Fulton Street Line in 1915 as part of the BMT's portion of the Dual Contracts. This was the only section of the Fulton El that was built specifically to handle steel subway cars, as opposed to lighter wooden elevated cars.

The current service pattern along the line is one of the newest in the New York City Subway system. Prior to December 1988, express service was only provided during rush hours, and before 1999, all trains ran local on weekends and weekday evenings after 9:00 pm. Since May 2, 1999, A trains run express along the line and C trains run local except during late nights, when A trains make all stops.

Route
Entering Brooklyn via the Cranberry Street Tunnel as a two-track line, the IND Eighth Avenue Line travels east on Cranberry Street, then south on Jay Street. It becomes the Fulton Street Line at an interlocking north of Jay Street–MetroTech while briefly running parallel with the IND Culver Line. It turns away from the Culver Line onto Schermerhorn Street to the six-track Hoyt–Schermerhorn Streets station, which it shares with the Brooklyn–Queens Crosstown Line. The local tracks are unused at Hoyt-Schermerhorn Streets, but connect to the abandoned Court Street station which is now the site of the New York City Transit Museum. At this point, the line becomes a four-track system until Euclid Avenue.

The line continues east under Schermerhorn Street to the intersections of Third Avenue and Flatbush Avenue, across them onto Lafayette Avenue and then finally onto Fulton Street until Broadway Junction.

After Broadway Junction, the line leaves Fulton Street via Truxton Street, crosses Broadway, curves through a corner of the East New York Yard, crosses Jamaica Avenue and then south on Pennsylvania Avenue. It then turns east onto Pitkin Avenue until Euclid Avenue station. East of Euclid Avenue there are track connections to Pitkin Yard, and from either the express or local tracks to the two-track line towards Grant Avenue station. The four mainline trackways continue east on Pitkin Avenue, disused, and end at approximately Elderts Lane.

Past Grant Avenue, the line joins the former Fulton Street elevated via a ramp as it enters Queens, swinging somewhat north until it is over Liberty Avenue. Here, it becomes a three-track line, with the center track coming from Pitkin Yard. Just past Rockaway Boulevard, the IND Rockaway Line branches southward while the Fulton Street Line continues over Liberty Avenue to its terminus at Lefferts Boulevard.

History
The Fulton Street subway was the city-owned Independent System (IND)'s main line from Downtown Brooklyn to southern Queens. Along with the IND Eighth Avenue Line, it was also alternately known as the Washington Heights−East New York Line. The subway was built to replace the elevated Fulton Street Elevated, which ran above Fulton Street from Boerum Place to Van Sinderen Avenue, south along Van Sinderen Avenue to Pitkin Avenue, down Pitkin Avenue to Euclid Avenue, and up Euclid Avenue, where it turned east on Liberty Avenue. As in Manhattan, the older elevated tracks were seen as depressing real estate values. The subway was designed to follow the elevated line as close as possible. It was routed along Schermerhorn Street due to the presence of the IRT subway already below Fulton Street in downtown Brooklyn and along Pennsylvania Avenue in East New York so that wider curves could be built, allowing faster speeds. The local tracks were always designed to terminate in downtown Brooklyn as local elevated trains would terminate at the Sands Street station. The groundbreaking for the line was held on April 16, 1929, at Fulton Street and Arlington Place, near the future Nostrand Avenue station. The line was opened from Jay Street to Rockaway Avenue on April 9, 1936, including the stub terminal at Court Street.

To allow the subway line to be built, the following streets were widened from : Jay Street between Nassau Street to Fulton Street, Smith Street between Fulton Street and Atlantic Avenue, and Schermerhorn Street between Smith Street and Nevins Street. The land acquired to widen the streets was valued at $1.75 million.

Further construction was delayed by funding problems due to the Great Depression in the 1930s. This was temporarily solved by federal Works Progress Administration funding starting in 1936. The portion continuing from east of Rockaway Avenue along Pennsylvania and Pitkin Avenues to Crystal Street began construction in 1938. The next portion east from Crystal Street to around Grant Avenue, including the Euclid Avenue terminal and the Pitkin Yard, began construction in 1940. The progress lasted only a few years, as all work on the last portions in Brooklyn was stopped by December 1942 shortly after the United States entered World War II, with Broadway−East New York complete but not in operation due to lack of signal equipment, and the remaining stations to Euclid Avenue as unfinished shells.

The Court Street station was closed on June 1, 1946, due to low ridership and because of its close proximity to the Hoyt–Schermerhorn Streets station. After World War II ended, workers and materials became available for public use again. The badly needed extension to the more efficient terminal at Broadway−East New York (the current Broadway Junction station) opened on December 30, 1946.

The extension of the Fulton Street Line, the completion of which had been delayed due to war priorities, was finished by funds obtained by Mayor William O'Dwyer and was placed in operation on November 28, 1948, running along Pennsylvania Avenue and Pitkin Avenue to Euclid Avenue near the Queens border. Forty additional R10 cars were placed into service for the extension. The cost of the extension was about $46.5 million. It included the construction of the new Pitkin Avenue Storage Yard, which could accommodate 585 subway cars on 40 storage tracks. Because these stations were completed later than the rest of the line, they received different design features than other IND stations, including different wall tiles and fluorescent lighting.

The Fulton Street express tracks were not used in regular service until October 24, 1949. A trains began running express during rush hours to Broadway–East New York, with  trains extended to provide local service. The express reduced travel time by five minutes.

The  began running eleven car trains during rush hours on September 8, 1953. The extra train car increased the total carrying capacity by 4,000 passengers. The lengthening project cost $400,000.

In late 1952, the Board of Transportation began construction on a connection between the IND and both the Fulton El and the Rockaway Beach Branch of the Long Island Rail Road, which included a new underground station at Grant Avenue. The connection from the 80th Street elevated station to the rest of the BMT Fulton Elevated was severed on April 26, 1956, and the IND was extended east (track direction south) from Euclid Avenue via the intermediate station at Grant Avenue, and a connecting ramp (known as the Grant Avenue ramp). The new service to Lefferts Boulevard began three days later. On June 28, 1956, the connection to the IND Rockaway Line east of Rockaway Boulevard was opened.

The 2015–2019 MTA Capital Plan called for the Fulton Street Line's Clinton–Washington Avenues, Kingston–Throop Avenues, and Van Siclen Avenue stations, along with 30 others, to undergo a complete overhaul as part of the Enhanced Station Initiative. Updates would include cellular service, Wi-Fi, USB charging stations, interactive service advisories and maps, improved signage, and improved station lighting. However, in April 2018, it was announced that cost overruns had forced the MTA to reduce the number of subway stations included in the program from 33 stations to 20. The stations to be renovated along the IND Fulton Street Line were among the 13 stations without funding, which will be pushed back to the 2020–2024 Capital Plan.

Second System planned route
Early in the planning of the subway, the city considered recapturing parts of the BMT Jamaica Line, which had been built under the Dual Contracts. This would have created two branches of the Fulton Street Subway east of Broadway Junction. Bellmouths were built into the outer walls of the subway tunnel just east of the Broadway Junction station for a future connection.

The IND Fulton Street Line was supposed to be extended farther east into Queens as part of the IND Second System, via an extension of the Fulton Elevated or a new subway. The line would have gone as far as Springfield Boulevard in Queens Village or 229th Street in Cambria Heights, both near the Nassau County border. The line would have also had a spur to the Rockaways.

The 1929 Second System plan suggested recapturing and extending the Fulton elevated along Liberty, Brinkerhoff and Hollis Avenues to Springfield Boulevard, near Hempstead Turnpike, Belmont Park, and the Queens Village LIRR Station. The 1939 plan, meanwhile, proposed extending the subway along Pitkin Avenue to Cross Bay Boulevard in South Ozone Park, then along Linden Boulevard to Cambria Heights near the Cross Island Parkway. A spur would have branched off east of Cross Bay Boulevard, turning south to join with the former Rockaway Beach Branch of the Long Island Rail Road (now the IND Rockaway Line). This extended Fulton Street Line would have also facilitated service from the planned Second Avenue Subway via a river tunnel from Lower Manhattan to the then-terminal station at Court Street.

In a 1940 plan, which was revised in 1945, the IND Fulton Street Line would connect to the IND Rockaway Line in a similar manner to the 1939 plan, via an extension of the subway under Pitkin Avenue. The line, east of Euclid Avenue, would be 4 tracks, with local stations at 76th Street and 84th Street, and an express station at Cross Bay Boulevard. At Cross Bay Boulevard, a flying junction would let the local tracks cross over to the inside and the express tracks cross over to the outside. The layout would be similar to that of Manhattan's 168th Street station. East of Cross Bay Boulevard, another flying junction would bring a two-track branch over the line to a pair of portals north of Aqueduct–North Conduit Avenue station. Meanwhile, the Fulton Street Line's four tracks would merge into two tracks, and end at 105th Street (today's Aqueduct Racetrack), where a scissors crossover would be present just west of the station. Crossovers would also be located between the local and express pair of tracks east of 76th Street, and between the two express tracks east of Cross Bay Boulevard.

Currently the line ends at Lefferts Boulevard in Ozone Park (the former end of the Fulton El), and only the Rockaway extension was completed. The mainline tracks that go past the Euclid Avenue station were to be part of a 4-track line to Cambria Heights.

Station listing

References

External links

 
 An architectural drawing of the connection between the Liberty Avenue elevated and the IND Rockaway Line

1936 establishments in New York City
Bedford–Stuyvesant, Brooklyn
Fulton
Fulton Street
Fulton Street